Gladstone–Benaraby Road is a continuous  road route in the Gladstone region of Queensland, Australia. Much of the route is signed as State Route 58. Gladstone–Benaraby Road (number 185) is a state-controlled regional road.

Route Description
It continues east to an intersection with French Street, where it turns south as Gladstone–Benaraby Road.

Land uses along this road include residential, industrial and rural, including some areas of native vegetation.

State Route 58
State Route 58 follows a number of separately named roads from Benaraby to Gladstone, and from Gladstone to Mount Larcom. It is a slightly longer alternative to the Bruce Highway. It leaves the Bruce Highway at Benaraby and follows the Gladstone–Benaraby Road north. In South Gladstone it turns west on Philip Street and then north on Glenlyon Road, which soon becomes Glenlyon Street. This runs generally west until it reaches , where it changes to Gladstone–Mount Larcom Road, which continues south-west, west, and north-west until it reaches the Bruce Highway at Mount Larcom.

Road condition
Gladstone–Benaraby Road is fully sealed.

History

The area where Gladstone now stands was the site of a short-lived convict settlement in 1847. In 1853 a new town was surveyed, and the next year a government agent was appointed, resulting in an influx of free settlers as land became available throughout the region. The first school opened in 1861, and the town became a Municipality in 1863. Development was slow until 1893 when a meatworks was established. The railway line arrived in 1897.

In January 1854, the New South Wales government proclaimed two new districts: Port Curtis (based on Gladstone) and Leichhardt (later renamed Fitzroy, based on Rockhampton). This released vast amounts of good grazing land for selection. Pastoral runs were soon taken up in these areas, leading to the cutting of tracks suitable for wheeled vehicles from the commercial centres to the properties. One such track was the forerunner of the Gladstone-Benaraby Road, while others formed the basis of what eventually became the Bruce Highway.

Benaraby was an area of small farms in the 1880s, with the first school opening in 1886. Further south,  had a post office from 1877. Its population increased in the 1890s with the growth of a thriving timber industry, and the first school opened in 1897. Prior to the arrival of the railway in 1897 these and other localities were dependent on a reliable road connection to Gladstone for their commercial success.

Upgrades
A project to construct additional lanes in Philip Street, Gladstone, at a cost of $20 million, was completed in August 2021.

Major intersections
All distances are from Google Maps. The entire road is in the Gladstone local government area.

See also

 List of road routes in Queensland
 List of numbered roads in Queensland

References

Roads in Queensland